Vaai is a Samoan surname that may refer to the following people:
Lesatele Rapi Vaai, Samoan judge
Olo Fiti Vaai, Samoan politician
Vaepule Alo Vaemoa Vaai (1953—2020), Samoan lawyer and judge

Samoan-language surnames
Surnames of Samoan origin